Ann George Atwater (July 1, 1935 – June 20, 2016) was an American civil rights activist in Durham, North Carolina. Throughout her career she helped improve the quality of life in Durham through programs such as Operation Breakthrough (Durham, North Carolina), a community organization dedicated to fight the War on Poverty. She became an effective activist and leader when advocating for black rights, such as better private housing. Atwater promoted unity of the working-class African Americans through grassroots organizations.

She is best known as one of the co-chairs of a charrette in 1971 to reduce school violence and ensure peaceful school desegregation. It met for ten sessions. She showed that it was possible for whites and blacks, even with conflicting views, to negotiate and collaborate by establishing some common ground.

Early life
Ann Atwater was born in 1935 in Hallsboro, North Carolina as one of nine children to parents who were sharecroppers; her father was also a deacon of the church. Her father earned only five cents an hour; Ann and her siblings also worked on farms as children to help support the family. In the documentary An Unlikely Friendship, Atwater recalled that while working on a white owner's farm, she was given food only through the back door and after the white workers had eaten. She was taught that whites were better and that their needs came before hers. She learned to take second place.

After marrying at the age of thirteen to French Wilson, Ann moved with him from the countryside to Durham in hopes of better job opportunities, as the city had large tobacco and textile industries. At the time, Durham had a fairly large black population, with a considerable portion of educated, middle-class blacks, in addition to white residents and poor blacks. Poverty was still a problem in the segregated society; in 1950 28% of families lived below the designated poverty line of $3000. The poor blacks of Durham had to fight both racial and class divisions: one against the whites who claimed superiority and another against the wealthier blacks who did not want to associate themselves with the lower class. Such struggles helped shape Atwater as an activist. Durham's prosperous black business sector made the city a beacon of hope for African Americans seeking to rise through self-help.

But Atwater's husband struggled financially, and became alcoholic and abusive. Eventually Atwater divorced him and raised their two daughters on her own as a single mother. She survived on $57 a month from a welfare check, and struggled to pay rent, as she gained only occasional domestic work in white homes. She made dresses out of flour and rice bags for her daughters to wear. The only foods she could afford for her children were rice, cabbage, and fatback. The faucets in the bathroom were faulty, shooting out water so intensely that her kids nicknamed it “Niagara Falls”. The roof of her house was full of holes, the bathtub had fallen through the floor, and “the house was so poorly wired that when the man cut off [her] lights for nonpayment, [she] could stomp on the floor and the lights would come on and [she’d] stomp on the floor and they’d go off”. She joked in a later interview that the house didn't need windows because she could see everyone on the streets through the cracks in the wall.

Operation Breakthrough
When approached by Howard Fuller to join Operation Breakthrough, a program to help people escape poverty, Atwater found her life purpose. Operation Breakthrough helped people define and accomplish a series of tasks in order to build a pattern of achievement. It helped participants gain confidence that they could achieve change and escape poverty. People worked at job-training, took after-school tutoring, or became educated as to their rights. It was funded by the North Carolina Fund, a statewide program to improve education. Fuller met with each resident enrolled in Operation Breakthrough, getting to know them personally and helping identify issues to be fixed.

One day when Atwater went to the welfare office to see if she could get $100 to pay her overdue rent and avoid eviction, she happened to meet Fuller. She showed him her house and he invited her to his program. The next day Atwater and Fuller went to Atwater's landlord to demand repairs for her house and, to Atwater's surprise, her landlord agreed to fix some of the problems. To her knowledge, making demands from a landlord was unheard of and she had no idea that she had the right to do so. Afterward she attended the Operation Breakthrough meeting and discussed how the poor had to work together to get the government's attention in order to help solve poverty and what her concerns were. That first meeting marked the start of her involvement in helping the poor black community fight poverty.

Gradually Atwater became a leader among the participants in Operation Breakthrough meetings. She began to represent poor people with housing problems, and would go door-to-door telling others of her own previous housing problems and how she was able to resolve them. She became an expert on housing policies; she copied and handed out welfare regulation manuals so that people could learn their rights, such as asking landlords to fix substandard conditions. Atwater mobilized poor blacks in Durham to help them stand up for themselves. Her goal was to teach the people the necessary skills to survive.

Atwater fought against the lack of respect that many whites showed blacks. She knew that some welfare workers were guilty of this. For example, when addressing a white person, the welfare worker would politely call the person over to the desk and there privately ask “Your name? Your address?” When addressing black people, the workers would holler at them across the room, “What you here for?” This embarrassed the black client, who was forced to explain private issues in front of a room full of strangers.

One tactic Atwater used to tackle this problem was using the power of numbers. She organized groups of women who had to visit the welfare offices frequently and had them push for change. With her persistence, the office set up private booths for meetings with each client. Such a system is still in use today.

Involvement in Durham charrette
In July 1971, the public schools were still segregated, despite the 1954 US Supreme Court ruling that segregated schools were unconstitutional, and 1960s federal civil rights legislation about integration of public facilities. The Durham federal district court had just ordered desegregation of schools to comply with the Supreme Court ruling, an action which was still opposed by many residents. Durham schools suffered from increasing racial tensions among students anxious about the future.

Students were getting into fights at schools over the issue. To manage the transition to racial integration, councilman Bill Riddick called a charrette. Those collaborative processes involved ten days of town meetings among numerous residents, in order to hear as many voices as possible and to resolve issues related to implementation of the court order. Riddick recruited participants from all sectors of Durham. He invited Atwater to co-lead the charrette with C. P. Ellis, who was then the Exalted Grand Cyclops of the Durham Ku Klux Klan.

Ellis had regularly been attending city council meetings, school board meetings, and county meetings to oppose civil rights changes and its activists. When Atwater had first met C. P. Ellis at a previous Durham city council meeting, she felt great resentment toward him. Ellis was known for making provocative and inaccurate remarks expressing his fears and resentments of blacks, such as: “Blacks are taking over the city. They got all the good jobs and you’re all sittin’ here letting ‘em do it.”  He said that black people should stay on the other side of the railroad because they had no business in town.

Atwater initially declined to serve as co-chair, but reluctantly agreed to work with Ellis. He had similar feelings, saying, "It was impossible. How could I work with her?" Atwater and Ellis came to realize some commonalities, among them that their children were ostracized because of the parents' working together. They wanted their children to attend schools free of violence.

Ellis later said, 
“Here we are, two people from the far end of the fence, having identical problems, except her being black and me being white…The amazing thing about it, her and I, up to that point, [had] cussed each other, bawled each other, we hated each other. Up to that point, we didn’t know each other. We didn’t know we had things in common.”They talked about the hardships of raising children in poverty, and their efforts to emphasize that their children's potential was equal to that of middle-class children.

The two antagonists eventually learned to work together and, to everyone’s astonishment, became good friends. Moving past race, they began to focus on other issues, such as the academic quality of Durham’s schools. Ellis came to realize that blacks were not suppressing poor whites, and that the two groups shared problems. Atwater had made Ellis begin to question his way of thinking toward blacks. By the end of the charrette, Ellis gave up his leadership in the KKK.

Atwater and Ellis presented the School Board with a list of recommendations from the charrette, including giving students a larger say on education issues by expanding the board to include two students from each of the major racial groups. They also proposed major changes in the school curriculum, such as more instruction on dealing with racial violence, creation of a group to discuss and resolve problems before they escalated, and expansion in choices of textbooks to include African-American authors.

Personality
According to C.P. Ellis, Ann Atwater's voice was deep and powerful, and she had the ability to energize her audience. She became an effective leader. She was not afraid to voice her opinions loudly and proudly. She was also not afraid to tell anyone to “go to hell” if she felt like it. She concluded that the most effective method of getting people to listen to her was to “holler at them.” When she called a meeting, she meant business.

In one meeting with a councilman, Atwater recalls that when he was not taking her seriously as she was trying to make her points, she would hit him on the head, surprising him so much that he would listen to her afterwards. Atwater also expressed her opinions at city council meetings, which had only white members. Because the white councilmen did not want to listen to a black woman talk, they turned their chairs away from her. She turned those chairs back around to force them to face her. Her bold actions so surprised the councilmen that they had to listen to her. Some people may not have liked that she was demanding and outspoken, but those qualities enabled her to be a successful activist and organizer.

Later life
After Atwater co-led the charrette, she continued to work with the poor and middle-class black community in Durham. She married Willie Pettiford in 1975, and became a deacon at the Mount Calvary United Church of Christ. She and Ellis continued their friendship to the end of their lives.

From 2006 until her death, Atwater worked with Jonathan Wilson-Hartgrove at the School for Conversion as a "freedom teacher," mentoring young people and activists in community organizing and fusion politics. The school's Ann Atwater Freedom Library continues her work of "making surprising friendships possible".

Atwater died June 20, 2016.

Legacy and honors
1967, she was recognized as Carolina Times Woman of the Year
A book, Best of Enemies, was written about her unlikely friendship with C.P. Ellis.  The book was adapted as a play of the same name, which premiered in Durham in 2013, and a 2019 movie of the same name. 
Durham mayor Bill Bell declared December 6, 2013 to be "Ann Atwater Day" in the city.
Atwater was recognized alongside C. P. Ellis as main honorees by the Sesquicentennial Honors Commission at the Durham 150 Closing Ceremony in Durham, North Carolina, on November 2, 2019. The posthumous recognition was bestowed upon Atwater and Ellis for their contributions to the desegregation of Durham Public Schools in 1971.

In popular culture
Ann Atwater: Grassroots Organizer and Veteran of America’s Freedom Struggle (2002), is a documentary about her work as an activist. 
An Unlikely Friendship (2002) is a documentary about the friendship that developed between Atwater and C.P. Ellis, the head of the local Ku Klux Klan chapter. 
The feature film, The Best of Enemies (2019), focuses on Atwater's role as an activist and co-chair of the charrette on solving public school issues. She is played by Taraji P. Henson; Sam Rockwell plays C.P. Ellis.

References

Further reading
Ann Atwater, interview by Jennifer Fiumara and Mary Cleary, The Southern Oral History Program at University of North Carolina at Chapel Hill, December 7, 1995.
Christina Green, Our Separate Ways: Women and the Black Freedom Movement in Durham, North Carolina (The University of North Carolina Press, 2005).
Robert R. Korstad and James L. Leloudis, To Right These Wrongs: The North Carolina Fund and the Battle to End Poverty and Inequality in 1960s America (The University of North Carolina Press, 2010).  
Ann Atwater, interview by Sean Aery, Sallie Bingham Center for Women's History and Culture, February 1, 2006.
Osha Gray Davidson, The Best of Enemies: Race and Redemption in the New South (UNC Press Books, 1996) . Quotes
Maegan Lobo-Berg, The Reality of Self-Help in Durham’s Operation Breakthrough. 
Kevin Washington, “C.P. Ellis Says Klan Days Have Been Over for Awhile,” Black Ink, December 7, 1984
Jean Bradley Anderson, Durham County: A History of Durham County, North Carolina (Duke University Press, 1990) 
Cliff Bellarny, “Bold Measure for Difficult Times,” The Herald Sun,12 December 2012

Activists for African-American civil rights
1935 births
2016 deaths